Musakhail
() is a district in the northeast of the Balochistan province of Pakistan. It became a separate district in 1992, prior to which it was a tehsil within Loralai District. Musakhail District is now part of Loralai Division is created after splitting Zhob Division.

History 
After the first phase of the Afghan war of 1878-79 AD, the British took control of the northern areas of Balochistan under the Treaty of Gandamak. During 1879-84 AD, efforts were made to extend the British influence over the Khetrans and Musakhels of the, now Musakhel, territory. The Musakhels took part in outrages committed by the Kakars under Shah Jahan in 1884, but surrendered to the British government on the conclusion of the expedition in the same year. On 1 November 1887, the whole area was declared part of British India. Zhob agency was formed in 1890 and Musakhel territory was annexed to it. Musakhel was made a tehsil in 1892 and was transferred to Loralai district in October 1903.

In 1905, the Musakhel tehsil comprised 61 villages and the total population, according to 1901 census, was 15,537 (8,374 males and 7,163 females). The principal tribes represented were: Isot  (1,941); Jafar (1,026); Panri  (10,144) including the Musakhel clan (9,748) the principal divisions of which were the Belkhel (7,662) and Laharzai (2,086); and Syed Gharshin (271). The chief language spoken was Pushto. Musakhel remained a tehsil of Loralai district till 1 January 1992 when it was notified as a district as a result of splitting Loralai district into 3 districts, Loralai, Musakhel, and Barkhan.

Geography 
Musakhail District is located in north-eastern border of Balochistan and bordering to Khyber Pakhtunkhwa and Dera Ghazi Khan, Punjab. The district comprises 5728km². The headquarters of the district is Bazar Musakhel.

Climate 
The climate of Musakhail, located 1,200–2,400 metres above sea level, is semi-arid. It can be placed in the "warm summer and mild winter" temperature region. The summer is hot with mean temperatures ranging from 21 °C to 32 °C. June is the hottest month when maximum temperature does exceed 32 °C and occasionally rises above 38 °C. Summer is longer than winter and lasts for about 7 months (April–October). In winter the temperature drops below 21 °C, but in the coolest month (January) the mean monthly temperature drops below 10 °C. The mercury may touch the freezing point during cold spells. Some areas of Musakhel also receives snowfall in winter like Kingri and Rarasham.

Administrative divisions 
The district of Musakhel is divided into four Tehsils:
 Darug
 Kingri
 Musakhel
 Toisar

Demography 
At the time of the 2017 census the district had a population of 167,243, of which 14,135 (8.45%) lived in urban areas. Musakhel had a sex ratio of 843 females per 1000 males and a literacy rate of 25.86% - 34.46% for males and 15.87% for females. 69,678 (41.66%) were under 10 years of age. 108 people in the district were from religious minorities.

The main tribes of the district are the Musakhels, Zimri, Jafars, Essot,Qaisrani,Gharshin(Syed) and Buzdars.

At the time of the 2017 census, 83.28% of the population spoke Pashto and 12.51% Balochi as their first language. There are some speakers of Khetrani as well, with languages recorded as 'Other' on the census being 2.50% of the population.

Education 
Musakhail District is ranked at the 81st position in the education score index of the Pakistan District Education Rankings 2017 published by Alif Ailaan. The education score is composed of the learning score, retention score and gender parity score. Retention is one of the biggest concerns in this district, with the relevant score being only 43.79 out of a potential 100. While, gender parity and learning scores lying a little above average. There has been only a slight improvement in the provision of post primary school infrastructure, with government primary schools still accounting for over 80% of the total number of government schools in the province, with a score of 27.87.

In percentage terms, the allocations for education in Baluchistan have seen the highest growth compared to all other provinces during the 2013–2018 tenure, including district Musakhel. According to the National Education Management Information System data 2016–2017, the structural and governance reforms have yet to create an impact in terms of better provision of school infrastructure to students and teachers of all districts in Baluchistan.

Issues reported by the residents via the Taleem Do! App complain of the lack or absenteeism of teachers.

Recreational places 
Musakhail is one the beautiful and least explored District of Balochistan. It has beautiful meadows and green valleys in all of its Tehsils and Sub-Tehsils. Some of the promising site for recreational purpose are Silyauza, Toi Sar, and Mizri Ghar. In summer season a lot of people from adjoining areas visit these cold places and enjoy their free time. Beside these areas there are other picnic points like Behu in Drug Tehsil.

See also
Burg pusht
Mizri Ghar

References

Bibliography

External links
 Musakhel District at www.balochistan.gov.pk
 Musakhel District at www.balochistanpolice.gov.pk

Musakhel District, Pakistan
Districts of Balochistan, Pakistan